Xavier Saint-Just pseud, of Georges Neczpal (age unknown) was a 20th-century French artist, painter and illustrator. He illustrated ads for many of the top magazines during the 1950s and 1960s. He is most widely regarded as a children's book illustrator but also created erotic art under the slight name variation of Xavier Saint-Justh into the 1980s. His whimsical style of art was very influential and is still imitated by illustrators today. Among the best-known of Saint-Just's art works are his Bambi paintings which were commissioned for a children's book by Felix Salten, they have been reproduced on everything from clothes and handbags to cigarette lighters .

Bibliography 
 Les Cavernes de la Rivière Rouge. (The Caves on the Red River). by Claud Cenac. Published Magnard 1967
 The Mischievous Kitten. by Yvonne Cruwys. Published London, Ward Lock, 1966.
 The Adventures of Bambi. by Felix Salten.
 La Chèvre et Les Biquets - d'après Les Frères Grimm. (The Goats and the Bridge - by the Brothers Grimm). Published France, Bias, 1967

References

 

French illustrators
20th-century French painters
20th-century French male artists
French male painters
Possibly living people
Year of birth missing